The women's javelin throw event at the 1999 European Athletics U23 Championships was held in Göteborg, Sweden, at Ullevi on 29 July and 1 August 1999.

Medalists

Results

Final
1 August

Participation
According to an unofficial count, 12 athletes from 8 countries participated in the event.

 (1)
 (1)
 (1)
 (1)
 (3)
 (2)
 (1)
 (2)

References

Javelin throw
Javelin throw at the European Athletics U23 Championships